Elsy is a name. Notable people with this name include:

Given name
 Elsy Steinberg, birth name of Elaine Stewart (1930–2011), American actress and model
 Elsy Borders (1905–1971), English activist
 Elsy Jacobs (1933–1998), Luxembourgish road bicycle racer
 Elsy Rivas (born 1949), Colombian sprinter
 Elsy del Pilar Cuello (born 1959), Colombian judge

Surname
 Hannah Elsy (born 1986), British rower